Mesonia hippocampi is a Gram-negative and rod-shaped bacterium from the genus of Mesonia which has been isolated from the brood pouch of an ill seahorse (Hippocampus barbouri).

References

Flavobacteria
Bacteria described in 2015